The  is a private university located in Minamiuonuma city in Niigata Prefecture, Japan.

IUJ is the first graduate university in Japan, not offering undergraduate degrees, and one of the few Japanese universities which offers all courses in English. It was founded in 1982. IUJ offers Master's degrees in International Development, Economics, Public Management, and International Relations, as well as an MBA in business administration. The Digital Transformation Program was established in 2021, another one-year new program the International Public Policy Program will be established in 2022. IUJ is fully approved and accredited by the Ministry of Education, Japan, The Graduate School of International Management proudly obtained accreditation from AACSB in 2018. 

In any given academic year there are students from about 50 countries. This diversity is accentuated by the fact that there are only 310 total students on campus. The diversity was celebrated as part of IUJ's 25th anniversary through a Guinness World Record record breaking attempt - "The most nationalities in a sauna (50)".

History

IUJ was founded in 1982 by representatives of business, government and world organizations. It was established with extensive support from Japan’s industrial, financial and educational communities as well as from the local community.

IUJ is Japan's first graduate-school-only university (no undergraduate campus), and the first to use English only in the classroom.

The Graduate School of International Relations (GSIR) was the first school at IUJ. Leading supporters IUJ’s foundation included the Japan Association of Corporate Executives, Japan Federation of Economic Organizations, Industrial Bank of Japan, Japan Chamber of Commerce and Industry and Japan Foreign Trade Council.

In 1988, the Graduate School of International Management (GSIM) was established in collaboration with the Amos Tuck School of Business at Dartmouth College, United States, as the first US-style business school in Japan, and the first MBA to teach only in English. In that same year, the Matsushita Library & Information Center (MLIC) was established with an endowment from the Matsushita International Foundation, now called the Kinoshita Matsushita Memorial Foundation (KMMF).

Structure

IUJ comprises two graduate schools: the Graduate School of International Relations (GSIR) and the Graduate School of International Management (GSIM). Both schools offer Master’s degree programs.

The university runs two research institutes: The IUJ Research Institute based on campus and The Center for Global Communications (GLOCOM) located in Tokyo. GLOCOM was established in spring of 1991 as a social science institute specializing in the study of information society and Japan. GLOCOM's research focuses on the social, economic and cultural impacts of new communications technologies.

Academic programs

Degree programs
IUJ offers only Master’s degree programs.  To apply, applicants must have finished a 4-year bachelor's program or equivalent, and be able to study in the English Language.  Those applying to the MBA must also submit a GMAT form.

The Graduate School of International Management (GSIM) offers four graduate programs: a full-time 2-year MBA program, a 1-year MBA program targeted at company sponsored students with over 5 years of experience, and a Japan-Global Development Program and the Digital Transformation Program . The Business School's working Motto is "Leveraging Emerging Asia for Global Advantage."

The Graduate School of International Relations (GSIR) offers three graduate programs and 5 master's degrees: International Relations Program (IRP) offering an MA in international relations and MA in Political Science, the International Development Program (IDP) offering an MA in International Development and an MA in Economics, Public Management and Policy Analysis Program (PMPP) offering an MA in public management and an MA in Public Policy, Japan-Global Development Program (JGDP) offering an MBA in International Relations/Economics/International Development/ Public Management, a one-year new program International Public Policy will offer a Master in International Public Policy.

Since cross-registration is encouraged, students may select 'elective' courses from other programs to customize their graduate degree program for their individual professional goals.

All the courses are two-year programs (21 months), except 1-year MBA which run for one year (12 months). All courses require a thesis as part of the degree requirements.

Language programs
IUJ offers two optional language programs, one in English and the other in Japanese.

The English language courses are designed for non-native English speakers who wish to develop their proficiency to the level required to participate fully in the English-medium environment of IUJ. IUJ offers various English program, it includes an Intensive English Program (IEP) held in the summer and academic English courses that mostly for students to prepare their thesis writing and it held throughout the academic year.

The Japanese Language Program (JLP) offers non-native Japanese speakers the opportunity to learn the Japanese language at four different proficiency levels, from Basic to Advanced.

Ties to Corporate Japan
Its Global Partnership program puts IUJ in formal relationships with over 50 companies in Japan spanning banking, consulting, trade and logistics firms.  These companies, and more, take advantage of IUJ's Non-degree programs, such as the Executive Degree program, the Global Leaders program, and the 8-week Intensive English Program.

Exchange programs
IUJ has established student exchange programs with more than 50 institutions across Asia, Europe, and North America. The purpose is to give students various opportunities to learn in different educational environments and to broaden their horizons. Up to ten credits earned at the host institution could be transferred to IUJ with no extra tuition paid to the host institution.

Updated lists of the GSIR and GSIM partner schools at the respective school websites.

The following are GSIR's students exchange partners:
  Norman Paterson School of International Affairs, Carleton University (Canada)
Faculty of Social Sciences - Charles (Czech)
Bocconi University (Italy)
Blanquerna School of Communication and International Relations-Ramon Llull (Spain)
School of International Trade and Economics -UIBE (China)
Graduate School of International Studies - SNU (Korea)
Graduate School of International Studies -Yonsei (Korea)
Graduate School of International Studies -Ewha (Korea)
Thammasat University (Thailand)
  College of Social Sciences NCCU(Taiwan)

The following are GSIM's students exchange partners:
  Tuck School of Business, Dartmouth College (USA)
  Kenan-Flagler Business School - UNC (USA)
Owen Graduate School of Management - Vanderbilt (USA)
Simon Business School - Rochester (USA)
Warrington College of Business Administration -UF (USA)
John Molson School of Business -Concordia (Canada)
Schulich School of Business - York (Canada)
  Warwick Business School, University of Warwick (United Kingdom)
Aalto University (Finland)
SDA Bocconi School of Management (Italy)
  EMLYON Business School (France)
NEOMA Business School (France)
University of St. Gallen (Switzerland)
  WHU – Otto Beisheim School of Management (Germany)
Norwegian School of Economics (Norway)
ESADE Business School (Spain)
IESE Business School (Spain)
School of Business - Renmin (China)
  School of Economics, Fudan University (China)
  HKUST Business School (Hong Kong)
CUHK Business School (Hong Kong)
College of Commerce - NCCU (Taiwan)
  NUS Business School, The National University of Singapore (Singapore)
  Sasin Graduate Institute of Business Administration, The Chulalongkorn University (Thailand)
  Kulliyyah of Economic and Management Science, International Islamic University Malaysia
Master of Management Program, The Gadjah Mada University (Indonesia)
Indian Institute of Management, Ahmedabad (India)
Indian Institute of management, Bangalore (India)

Campus and student life

Location
IUJ is located in Minami-Uonuma, a small city on the southeastern end of Niigata prefecture, Japan. It is approximately 100 km south of Niigata city, the prefectural capital, and 230 km northwest of Tokyo.

Dormitory facilities

There are three single-student dormitories each housing about 100 students, and one married-student apartments (MSA) with just 18 units for married couples. Each dormitory has inexpensive coin laundry/dryer facilities. All the single dormitory rooms are well-equipped and offer LAN connectivity. MSA is unfurnished.  As there is a waiting list for the units, a lottery system is used to allocate them.  For those needing to bring families with school aged children, off-campus housing options are supported by an English speaking land.

There is an on-campus convenience shop, Yamazaki. There are recreational and sporting facilities available to the students.

Student Activities and Elected Offices 
Every full-time student enrolled in IUJ is automatically a member of the Graduate Student Organization (GSO), the students' union of IUJ. The GSO Executive Committee is a body of elected student representatives in-charge of general student welfare and campus life activities, plus outside events.

There is a number of annual on-campus and off-campus events organized by GSO with support from IUJ office and other clubs, such as IUJ Olympics, Ski Day, holiday parties, music nights, game nights, etc.

Two other elected student groups are the IM Council and the IR Council. These groups take care of the academic welfare of the students in their respective schools (GSIM and GSIR), and in close cooperation and communications with the Deans offices.

Corporate sponsorship
Sponsored students hail from industries like finance, electronics, manufacturing, telecoms, construction and retail.

One-on-One Career Counseling
Career Counseling and Services at IUJ is aimed at supporting each individual student in his or her internship and hob hunt.  Our small campus size ensures individual attention, coaching, and introductions customized to help students prepare for and reach their professional goals. This in-house career coaching service is unique in Japan.

IUJ Resume Book

IUJ publish a Resume Book in November each year and distribute it to companies and organizations in Japan and overseas by postal mail and to those who visit HR directly.

On Campus Recruiting Coordination

IUJ welcomes companies and organizations to recruit on IUJ campus for Information Sessions followed by interviews on the same day.  Video Conferencing or telephone, Online or Tokyo-based interviews can be also arranged.

People

Founders
Sohei Nakayama (中山 素平Nakayama Sohei), former chairman of the Japan Association of Corporate Executives (経済同友会Keizai Dōyukai), former president of the Industrial Bank of Japan
Toshiwo Doko (土光 敏夫 Dokō Toshio), 4th chairman of the Japan Business Federation (経団連Keidanren)
Shigeo Nagano (永野 重雄 Nagano Shigeo), 13th chairman of the Japan Chamber of Commerce and Industry (日本商工会議所Nihon-Syōkōkaigisyo)
Tatsuzo Mizukami (水上 達三Mizukami Tatsuzō), 3rd chairman of the Japan Foreign Trade Council (日本貿易会Nihon-Bouekikai)
Tadashi Sasaki (佐々木 直Sasaki Tadashi), 22nd Governor of the Bank of Japan (BOJ)

List of Chairman of the Board of Trustees

List of presidents

Faculty in Leadership Roles
Hyunkoo Lee, Financial Accounting
Wenkai Li, Supply Chain Management, Operations Management
Toshihiro Wakayama, Strategic management
Noboru Yamaguchi, International Politics, Japan-US alliance 
Tomohito Shinoda, Political scientist (Japan-U.S. Relations)
Maung Aung Myoe, Foreign Policy Analysis

Alumni
 Business
Takashi Saeki (Japan), CEO of the TOHO GAS Company
Erol Emed (Turkey), CEO of the Soul of Japan K.K.
Toshiya Ishibashi (Japan), CEO of the SSP Co., Ltd.
Cenk Naci Gurol (Turkey), CEO of Aeon Global SCM 
Masataka Jo (China), CEO of the Fuji Xerox China Limited
Charles Yin (China), chairman and CEO Worldwide City Group, founder of The China-Japan CEO Forum (CJCF)
Mike Takano (Japan), Industrial Tycoon
Ganzorig Vanchig (Mongolia), senior vice president of business portfolio firm Shunkhlai Group (2014 Young Global Leader by the World Economic Forum)
Public Sector
Soe Han (Myanmar), Ambassador Extraordinary and Plenipotentiary of the Republic of the Union of Myanmar to Japan
Motohiro Ono (Japan), the Governor of Saitama Prefecture, former member of the House of Councillors in the Diet (national legislature)
Hiroyuki Abe (Japan), journalist (Fuji Television)
Yohei Mori (Japan), journalist (Mainichi Shimbun)
 Academic
 Tomohito Shinoda (Japan), A faculty member of IUJ

References 

Private universities and colleges in Japan
International University of Japan
Minamiuonuma